In classical mythology, Epopeus ('all-seer', derived from epopao "to look out", "observe", from epi "over" and ops "eye"), was a king of Lesbos (the large island in the Aegean Sea opposite the coast of Asia Minor) who committed incest with his daughter Nyctimene.

Mythology 
The name Nycteus signifies "of the night", as does Nyctimene in the following variant: according to accounts by the Roman Gaius Julius Hyginus and in Ovid's Metamorphoses (ii.590), an Epopeus was a king of Lesbos. He had sexual intercourse with his henceforth nocturnal daughter Nyctimene, whom Minerva in pity transformed into an owl, the bird that shuns the daylight.

Note

References 
 Gaius Julius Hyginus, Fabulae from The Myths of Hyginus translated and edited by Mary Grant. University of Kansas Publications in Humanistic Studies. Online version at the Topos Text Project.
Publius Ovidius Naso, Metamorphoses translated by Brookes More (1859-1942). Boston, Cornhill Publishing Co. 1922. Online version at the Perseus Digital Library.
Publius Ovidius Naso, Metamorphoses. Hugo Magnus. Gotha (Germany). Friedr. Andr. Perthes. 1892. Latin text available at the Perseus Digital Library.

People from ancient Lesbos
Characters in Greek mythology